Fimbristylis is a genus of sedges. A plant in this genus may be known commonly as a fimbry or   fimbristyle. There are 200 to 300 species distributed worldwide. Several continents have native species but many species have been introduced to regions where they are not native. Some are considered weeds. These are typical sedges in appearance, with stiff, ridged stems and cone-shaped terminal panicles of spikelets. They are found in wet environments, and are most diverse in tropical and subtropical regions.

Selected species:
Fimbristylis acicularis
Fimbristylis acuminata - pointed fimbristylis
Fimbristylis aestivalis - summer fimbry
Fimbristylis agasthyamalaensis  
Fimbristylis annua - annual fimbry
Fimbristylis ammobia
Fimbristylis autumnalis - slender fimbry
Fimbristylis blakei
Fimbristylis blepharolepis
Fimbristylis caespitosa
Fimbristylis cardiocarpa
Fimbristylis castanea - marsh fimbry, salt marsh fimbristylis
Fimbristylis cephalophora
Fimbristylis cinnamometorum
Fimbristylis compacta
Fimbristylis complanata - Puerto Rico fimbry
Fimbristylis corynocarya
Fimbristylis crosslandii - Formerly C. setifolia 
Fimbristylis costiglumis
Fimbristylis cymosa - tropical fimbry,  (= F. glomerata)
Fimbristylis denudata
Fimbristylis depauperata
Fimbristylis dichotoma - two-leaf fimbrystylis, tall fringe-rush
Fimbristylis dictyocolea
Fimbristylis dipsacea
Fimbristylis elegans
Fimbristylis eremophila
Fimbristylis ferruginea - rusty sedge, West Indian fimbry
Fimbristylis hawaiiensis - Hawaii fimbry
Fimbristylis helicophylla - twisted leaf fimbristylis
Fimbristylis hirsutifolia
Fimbristylis inaguensis - Bahama fimbry
Fimbristylis insignis
Fimbristylis lanceolata
Fimbristylis laxiglumis
Fimbristylis leucocolea
Fimbristylis littoralis - lesser fimbristylis
Fimbristylis macassarensis
Fimbristylis macrantha
Fimbristylis microcarya
Fimbristylis miliacea - grasslike fimbry
Fimbristylis neilsonii
Fimbristylis onchnidiocarpa
Fimbristylis perpusilla - Harper's fimbry
Fimbristylis polytrichoides - rusty sedge
Fimbristylis puberula - hairy fimbry
Fimbristylis schoenoides - ditch fimbry
Fimbristylis spathacea - hurricanegrass
Fimbristylis thermalis - hot springs fimbry
Fimbristylis tomentosa - woolly fimbry
Fimbristylis tristachya
Fimbristylis umbellaris - globular fimbrystylis
Fimbristylis vahlii - Vahl's fimbry
Fimbristylis velata (now distinguished from F. squarrosa)

References

External links
Jepson Manual Treatment
eFloras Genus Account
USDA Plants Profile: US species
PlantNET: Australian species

 
Cyperaceae genera
Taxa named by Martin Vahl